The Dominican National Police is the national police force of the Dominican Republic. It is the largest police force in the Dominican Republic under the control of the Ministry of Interior and Police.

Its main function is to protect the Dominican nation, enforce the law by constitutional mandate to maintain and guarantee the necessary conditions for public freedoms and rights and to ensure peaceful cohabitation among the population.

History 

During the U.S Occupation of Dominican Republic from 1916 to 1924, the United States Military assisted in creating the Dominican Constabulary Guard (DCG), which acted as national police and defense agency and the forerunner for today's Dominican National Police.

The National Congress of Dominican Republic enacted law 14 on November 5, 1930 which allows the leader of the Dominican Republic to appoint and dismiss municipal (local) heads of police. For the next six years Dominican Republic had various municipal (local) police officers as well as Constabulary Guard. The national police force itself (as the agency it is today) is not officially formed until March 2, 1936 with the congressional passing of decree No. 1523. With the formation of a new national police force, Colonel Miguel A. Roman was appointed as the head of the Dominican National Police. [2]

Training 

On May 17, 1966 a general training school for military and police officers was created in the DR. Two years later on June 20, 1968 the National Police Officer Training School was established in San Cristobal under the surpervision of the school's first director, Eulogio Benito. Later, General Order No. 014-2004 gave the academy the name the "National School of Public Safety" whose motto remains to this day "Education-Discipline-Protection."

In January 1983 a school of Criminal Investigations was created to provide advanced training to police officers who were given the positions of investigators in the National Police Force. The importance of training and education of police officers was recognized early on in the agency and various other "continuing education" and advanced training schools were created in various disciplines for officer in Dominican Republic National Poilice Force that are still in use today.

Homicide Division 

General Order No 47 created the Homicide division in January 1941 and was called the " Identification and Investigation" unit. In 1976 the name of the unit was changed to the "department of Investigations of Homicides". The Unit is responsible for investigating not only homicides and murders but also all incidents of suicide, gunshot wounds and all deaths of unknown causes in Dominican Republic.

Tourism Police 

The National Police force maintained a special unit to police the airports and tourism areas in Dominican Republic then in 1975 due to the popularity of tourism on the island and the crime that arose in the tourist areas the unit became a separate police force called POLITUR,"Policia de Turismo" (tourism police). The Policia de Turismo is now a separate agency from the National Police and the officers wear white shirts, blue pants and blue caps.

In 2013 POLITUR was reorganized as the Cuerpo Especializado de Seguridad Turística (CESTUR). This new organization is a part of the Ministry of Defense, changing it from a civilian police organization to a military one.

Aircraft inventory 

The Police operate 3 aircraft.

Notable staff

In 2020 the senior officer of the National Police was Ney Aldrín Bautista Almonte.

See also
Crime in the Dominican Republic
Law Enforcement in Dominican Republic

References

[2] https://web.archive.org/web/20161119035055/http://www.policianacional.gov.do/

Law enforcement in the Dominican Republic
National law enforcement agencies of the Dominican Republic
Law enforcement agencies of the Dominican Republic
Gendarmerie